Asela Wewalwala (born 11 May 1975) is a Sri Lankan former cricketer. He played in 112 first-class and 48 List A matches between 1994/95 and 2012/13. He made his Twenty20 debut on 17 August 2004, for Galle Cricket Club in the 2004 SLC Twenty20 Tournament.

References

External links
 

1975 births
Living people
Sri Lankan cricketers
Galle Cricket Club cricketers
Kurunegala Youth Cricket Club cricketers
Singha Sports Club cricketers
Place of birth missing (living people)